Pavelec (feminine Pavelcová) is a Czech surname. Notable people with the surname include:

 Marek Pavelec (born 1989), Czech violinist
 Miroslav Pavelec (1927–2019), Czech canoer
 Ondřej Pavelec (born 1987), Czech ice hockey player
 Ted Pavelec (1918–2005), American football player

Czech-language surnames